Arthur James "A. J." Guyton (born February 12, 1978) is an American former professional basketball player and now basketball coach. He played college basketball for Indiana University.

Indiana University 
Guyton chose to play basketball for the Indiana University Hoosiers under coach Bob Knight from 1996 to 2000. He was a four-year starter and appeared in every game while at Indiana. When he left, Guyton was Indiana's all-time leader in three-point baskets (283) and fourth in all-time scoring (2,100). He also ranked eighth in all-time Indiana assists (403) and tenth in steals (128).

Guyton's first year saw him become only the second Hoosier freshman to collect 400 points, 100 steals and 100 assists; the other to pull that off is Isiah Thomas. Guyton made the All-Big Ten Team his sophomore year and the Playboy pre-season All-American Team his last two seasons.

Guyton was rumored to be leaving Indiana following his junior year, but after Luke Recker departed the team one week after the season, Guyton announced he was staying. His senior year was a successful one in which he averaged 19.7 points per game. Guyton later recalled, "I remember it all like it was yesterday. Those are nights you live for. I felt back then I couldn't be guarded." In 2000, he was named Big Ten Co-MVP and that same year was selected to the first team 2000 All-American Team.

The end of his time at Indiana saw tumultuous changes when former Hoosier teammate Neil Reed went public with an accusation that Coach Knight had put a choke hold on him in practice three years before. Calling a special press conference to give the players' point of view were Guyton and his four-year running mate at guard, Michael Lewis. Guyton said later, "We wanted to stand up for coach Knight. We wanted to tell people what they didn't know. People always think it's coach Knight's fault. For him (Reed) to pick that time, our senior year, to come out and tell his story, it showed a lack of respect for our team."

Despite the controversies surrounding Knight, Guyton recalled his Indiana career fondly. "We had a lot of good wins. Those were the best four years of my life. I wouldn't change a thing. I would go back to Indiana and do it all over again."

On June 10, 2014, Guyton learned that he was being inducted into the Indiana University Basketball Hall of Fame.

Professional career 
Guyton was selected by the Chicago Bulls in the second round (32nd overall pick) in the 2000 NBA Draft. He played for the Bulls from 2000 to 2002 and briefly for the Golden State Warriors during the 2002–03 season. During his career in the NBA, he played in 80 games and averaged 5.5 points, 1 rebound and 1.8 assists. His final NBA game was played on November 20th, 2002 in a 100 - 94 win over the Chicago Bulls where he only played for 30 seconds and recorded no stats. He later played in the NBDL, Italy, Israel, Croatia, and Sweden. In 2006, he was diagnosed with glaucoma in each eye and underwent treatment for it. "One day in Italy, I looked up for a rebound and lost sight of the ball", he said. "I started having cloudy vision, seeing rings around the lights."

Post-player career 
In 2010 Guyton was an assistant coach at Illinois Central College. He was also head coach of the Bloomington Flex, a minor league team located in the Bloomington, Illinois area. Guyton led the Flex, then known as the Central Illinois Drive, to a 22–1 record in 2012 and a Premier Basketball League championship.  Guyton also led the Flex to a PBL title in 2013, winning Coach of the Year honors both seasons.  In 2014, the Flex were again the top team in the PBL under Guyton's leadership, finishing the season with a perfect 18–0 record.

In 2015, Guyton was appointed Consulting Director with the Midwest Professional Basketball Association.

On September 30, 2016, Guyton was appointed an assistant coach of the Windy City Bulls, a new NBA Development League franchise.

In September 2017, Guyton was named the director of player development for the Northwestern Wildcats men's basketball. 

In June 2018, Guyton was named an assistant coach for the Loyola Greyhounds men's basketball team.

References

External links
Career stats at basketball-reference.com

1978 births
Living people
African-American basketball players
All-American college men's basketball players
American expatriate basketball people in Croatia
American expatriate basketball people in Greece
American expatriate basketball people in Israel
American expatriate basketball people in Italy
American expatriate basketball people in Qatar
American expatriate basketball people in Sweden
American men's basketball players
Basketball coaches from Illinois
Basketball players from Illinois
Chicago Bulls draft picks
Chicago Bulls players
Competitors at the 1998 Goodwill Games
Fortitudo Pallacanestro Bologna players
Golden State Warriors players
Goodwill Games medalists in basketball
Greek Basket League players
Huntsville Flight players
Indiana Hoosiers men's basketball players
Junior college men's basketball coaches in the United States
KK Cedevita players
Loyola Greyhounds men's basketball coaches
Olympia Larissa B.C. players
Point guards
Shooting guards
Sundsvall Dragons players
Sportspeople from Peoria, Illinois
Viola Reggio Calabria players
Virtus Bologna players
Windy City Bulls coaches